The Spanish Bride is a historical novel by Georgette Heyer based on the true story of Sir Harry Smith and his wife Juana María de los Dolores de León Smith. He had a fairly illustrious military career and was made a baronet. The town of Ladysmith in South Africa is named after his wife.

Plot summary
After the siege and sack of the Spanish city of Badajoz by British and Portuguese forces in 1812, 14-year-old, convent raised orphan, Juana, and her older sister sought sanctuary among officers of the 95th Rifles in the British camp outside the city walls. From the first moment he saw her, Brigade-Major Harry Smith fell deeply in love with Juana. Over all objections from his brother officers, Harry married Juana a few days later.

Instead of letting herself be sent to her husband's family in England, she chose to accompany Harry with the army. She remained with him throughout the rest of the Peninsular War, accompanying the baggage train, sleeping in the open on the field of battle, riding freely among the troops, and sharing all the privations of campaigning. Her beauty, courage, sound judgment and amiable character endeared her to the officers, including the Duke of Wellington, and she was idolized by the soldiers.

After the defeat of Napoleon, Harry took Juana to London and installed her in lodgings. As Harry spoke fluent Spanish, he had never bothered to teach Juana to speak English, so engaged a tutor for her.

Harry had volunteered for service in the United States, where he witnessed the burning of the capitol at Washington, D.C. Following the Battle of New Orleans Harry returned to England. In the meantime, Harry's family had visited her in London and persuaded her to come and stay with them in the Isle of Ely, Cambridgeshire.

When Napoleon escaped from Elba, Harry returned with his regiment to Europe. Juana insisted on accompanying Harry and was in Belgium during the Battle of Waterloo. Following the battle, she insisted on searching the field for her husband's body when she was told that he had been killed. However, the report referred to another officer called Smyth and Juana was finally reunited with the uninjured Harry. The book ends with the pair embracing and Juana saying, "Mi tirano odioso!" (My odious tyrant)

Although the book is written as one of Heyer's Regency novels, she did a great deal of research; reading the diaries of Harry's brother officers and other Peninsular War veterans.

1940 British novels
Novels by Georgette Heyer
Historical novels
Heinemann (publisher) books
Novels set in the 1810s
Novels about orphans
British romance novels
Historical romance novels